John Peyton Garnett Nelson (June 13, 1873 – March 30, 1930) was an American college football coach and physician. He served as the head football coach at Richmond College—now known as the University of Richmond—in Richmond, Virginia, for one season, in 1901, compiling a record of 1–7.

A native of Richmond, Nelson attended the University of Virginia, where he played college baseball as a pitcher before graduating in 1895. He was hired to teach at Episcopal High School in Alexandria, Virginia in 1896. He also taught at St. Alban's School for Boys in Radford, Virginia and McGuire's University School in Richmond. Nelson graduated in 1900 from the Medical College of Virginia—now known as VCU School of Medicine—and was appointed a resident physician at  St Luke's Hospital in Richmond.

Nelson died of bladder cancer, on March 30, 1930, at St Luke's Hospital.

Head coaching record

References

External links
 

1873 births
1930 deaths
19th-century baseball players
20th-century American physicians
Baseball pitchers
Richmond Spiders football coaches
Virginia Cavaliers baseball players
Medical College of Virginia alumni
People from Fauquier County, Virginia
Baseball players from Richmond, Virginia
Coaches of American football from Virginia
Physicians from Virginia
Schoolteachers from Virginia
Deaths from bladder cancer
Deaths from cancer in Virginia